The Imperial Order of the Yoke and Arrows was a Spanish state and military order. It was established in 1937 under the dictatorship of Caudillo Francisco Franco and discontinued in 1976 following Franco's death and during the Spanish transition to democracy. The order was formally abolished in October 2022 under the Democratic Memory Law. The order came in five grades.

History 

The Imperial Order of the Yoke and Arrows was established on 1 October 1937 by Francisco Franco during the second year of the Spanish Civil War. The symbol of the yoke and arrows, known in Spanish as the yugo and flechas, was a symbol of the Catholic Monarchs of Spain during the late 15th and early 16th century, but was also used as a symbol of Falangism. The motto of the order was "To Cesar what is Cesar's and to God what is God's," in reference to Jesus' saying from Chapter 22 in the Gospel of Matthew. On 27 January 1943, a decree established that the award would be one of the leaders of the Falangist movement in Francoist Spain. The award was discontinued in 1976 during the Spanish transition to democracy but was not formally abolished until 2022.

Notable recipients

Spanish recipients 

 Juan Cabanas (es), 19 May 1939 (Commendation)
 Francisco Javier Conde (es), 18 July 1952 (Commendation with Plaque)
 Francisco Corbellini Obregón, 18 July 1952 (Commendation)
 Manuel Díez-Alegría, 18 July 1969 (Grand Cross)
 Francisco Franco, 1 October 1937 (Grand Collar)
 Cristóbal González-Aller y Balseyro, 18 July 1952 (Commendation with Plaque)
 Leonardo López Fernández, 18 July 1952 (Commendation)
 José Martínez Maza, 18 July 1952 (Commendation with Plaque)
 Aurelio Morazo Palomino, 18 July 1952 (Commendation)
 Francisco Priede González, 18 July 1952 (Medal)
 Manuel María Rincón, 19 March 1940 (Commendation)
 Adolfo Suárez, 4 July 1975 (Grand Cross)
 Theo Roger, 19 March 1940 (Commendation)
 Luis Vilches, 18 July 1952 (Medal)

Foreign recipients 

 Arturo Bocchini, 19 May 1939 (Grand Cross)
 Óscar Carmona, 19 May 1939 (Grand Collar)
 Francisco Craveiro Lopes, 14 May 1953 (Grand Collar)
 Faisal II of Iraq, 18 May 1956 (Grand Cross)
 Heinrich Himmler, 19 May 1939 (Grand Cross)
 Adolf Hitler, 4 October 1937 (Grand Collar)
 Georg Kolbe, 19 May 1939 (Commendation with Plaque)
 Hans Lammers, 9 February 1941 (Medal)
 Giandomenico De Marchis, 19 May 1939 (Commendation)
 Mohammed V of Morocco, 3 April 1956 (Grand Collar)
 Eugenio Morelli, 7 May 1940 (Commendation)
 Benito Mussolini, 4 October 1937 (Grand Collar)
 Ettore Muti, 3 June 1940 (Grand Cross)
 Hugh Pollard, 4 October 1937 (Grand Cross)
 Claro M. Recto, 19 March 1940 (Commendation)
 Joachim von Ribbentrop, 28 May 1940 (Grand Collar)
 Nuri al-Said, 1 April 1952 (Grand Cross)
 Saud of Saudi Arabia, 1 April 1952 (Grand Cross)
 Sami Solh, 1 April 1952 (Grand Cross)
 Victor Emmanuel III, 4 October 1937 (Grand Collar)

Gallery

See also 

 Order of Cisneros

References 

Awards established in 1937
1937 establishments in Spain
2022 disestablishments in Spain
Yoke and Arrows, Order of the
Yoke and Arrows, Order of the
Falangism